Bertelia grisella is a species of snout moth. It is found in North America, including Arizona.

References

Moths described in 1913
Phycitinae